A summons (also known in England and Wales as a claim form and in the Australian state of New South Wales as a court attendance notice (CAN)) is a legal document issued by a court (a judicial summons) or by an administrative agency of government (an administrative summons) for various purposes.

Judicial summons

A judicial summons is served on a person involved in a legal proceeding. Legal action may be in progress against the person, or the person's presence as witness may be required. In the former case, the summons will typically announce to the person to whom it is directed that a legal proceeding has been started against that person, and that a case has been initiated in the issuing court. In some jurisdictions, it may be drafted in legal English difficult for the layman to understand, while several U.S. states expressly require summonses to be drafted in plain English and that they must start with this phrase: "Notice! You have been sued."

The summons announces a date by which the person or persons summoned must either appear in court, or respond in writing to the court or the opposing party or parties. The summons is the descendant of the writ of the common law. It replaces the former procedure in common-law countries by which the plaintiff actually had to ask the sheriff to arrest the defendant in order for the court to obtain personal jurisdiction in both criminal and civil actions.

Types of summonses

Citation/claim (legal term)
A citation, traffic violation ticket, or notice to appear is a type of summons prepared and served at the scene of the occurrence by a law enforcement official, compelling the appearance of a defendant before the local magistrate within a certain period of time to answer for a minor traffic infraction, misdemeanor, or other summary offence. Failure to appear within the allotted period of time is a separate crime of failure to appear.

In Australia, minor traffic and some summary offences are known as an infringement notice or a fine and can be dealt with by paying a particular monetary amount depending on the offence. The accused person has the right to have the matter heard in a court; if found not guilty the accused person pays nothing other than his legal costs (if any); if found guilty the accused person faces the prospect of a conviction for the offence and/or a substantial increase in the fine up to the maximum. For example, proceeding through a red light could go from A$353 up to A$2,200 if convicted in NSW. For more serious offences, a field court attendance notice is issued.

In the United Kingdom and Hong Kong, law enforcement officials may deal with certain minor offences, such as littering, by issuing a fixed penalty notice, colloquially called an "on-the-spot fine", although legally they are not fines. They allow the recipient to avoid going to court by paying a penalty fixed by statute. If such a notice is ignored or disputed, a court summons will be issued as for any other offence.

Civil summons
A civil summons is most often accompanied by a complaint. Depending on the type of summons, there is often an option to endorse a summons so that the entity being served may be identified. In the court system in California, for civil unlimited cases in the superior court, a summons will often have these options to endorse:
 as an individual;
 as the person sued under the fictitious name of __;
 on behalf of (usually for a company); or
 by personal delivery on __

Administrative summons
One example of an administrative summons is found in the tax law of the United States. The Internal Revenue Code authorizes the U.S. Internal Revenue Service (IRS) to issue a summons for a taxpayer—or any person having custody of books of account relating to a business of a taxpayer—to appear before the U.S. Secretary of the Treasury or his delegate (generally, this means the IRS employee who issued the summons) at the time and place named in the summons. The person summoned may be required to produce books, papers, records, or other data, and to give testimony under oath before an IRS employee.

The IRS is also empowered to issue the section 7602 summons for the purpose of "inquiring into any offense connected with the administration or enforcement of the internal revenue laws".

The summons may be enforced by a court order, and the law provides a criminal penalty of up to one year in prison or a fine, or both, for failure to obey the summons, except that the person summoned may, to the extent applicable, assert a privilege against self incrimination or other evidentiary privileges, if applicable.

In the U.S. immigration court system, a "Notice to Appear" is an administrative summons ordering a respondent to appear before an immigration court for removal proceedings.

Summonses by jurisdictions

Australia
In the Australian state of New South Wales (NSW) the service of a court attendance notice can be issued in a number of ways, the most common of which is by the NSW Police Force when charging someone after an arrest is made, a bail court attendance notice (with bail conditions) or regular court attendance notice is issued. Other methods the police use include via a paper form called a field court attendance notice (field CAN) which is issued to the accused person on the spot after an offence has been detected. Or by way of a future court attendance notice (future CAN), which replaced the old court issued summons and is served in person by police or sometimes by mail. In all of these cases, the CAN is filed at the court after it has been served.

England and Wales
Historically, in old English law, a summons was called an auxilium curiae, although this term is now obsolete. In England and Wales, the term writ of summons for the originating document in civil proceedings has been replaced with the term claim form by the Civil Procedure Rules 1999 (CPR). This is part of the reforms to simplify legal terminology. However, despite its name, the claim form does not present the details of the claim itself (in other words, it does not replace the complaint). The complaint is now known as the particulars of claim. 

In criminal matters, either a requisition, summons or warrant is issued to initiate criminal proceedings.

United States
In most U.S. jurisdictions, the service of a summons is in most cases required for the court to have jurisdiction over the party who is being summoned. The process by which a summons is served is called service of process. The form and content of service in the federal courts is governed by Rule 4 of the Federal Rules of Civil Procedure, and the rules of many state courts are similar. The federal summons is usually issued by the clerk of the court. In many states, the summons may be issued by an attorney, but some states use filing as the means to commence an action and in those states, the attorney must first file the summons in duplicate before it becomes effective. One or more copies are stamped by the court clerk with the court seal and returned to the attorney, who then uses it to actually serve the defendants. Other jurisdictions may only require that the summons be filed after it is served on the defendants. New York is distinguished by its permissive filing system, in which the summons or complaint need not be filed at all.

See also
Subpoena
 subpoena ad testificandum
 subpoena duces tecum

Notes

External links
 Federal Rules of Civil Procedure
 UK Civil Procedure Rules 1998 online
 
 
 

Court orders
Legal documents
Legal terminology